Ningyang is a county under the administration of the prefecture-level city of Tai'an, Shandong Province, China.

Administrative divisions
As 2012, this county is divided to 9 towns and 3 townships.
Towns

Townships
Heshan Township
Dongzhuang Township
Xiangyin Township

Climate

References

Counties of Shandong
Tai'an